Interamnia – also, Interamna or Interamnium – is an ancient Latin placename, meaning "between rivers". There were at least three towns of ancient Italy so named:

 Interamna Nahars (or Nahartium), the modern Terni: the rivers are the Nera and the Serra
 Interamna Praetutiana (or Interamna Praetutianorum), the modern Teramo: the rivers are the Tordino and the Vezzola
 Interamna Lirenas, no modern successor, on the Liri River

Other
704 Interamnia, an asteroid named after the town of Teramo